Adult Contemporary is a chart published by Billboard ranking the top-performing songs in the United States in the adult contemporary music (AC) market.  In 2004, ten different songs topped the chart in 52 issues of the magazine, based on weekly airplay data from radio stations compiled by Nielsen Broadcast Data Systems.

In the first issue of Billboard of the new year, the number one song was "Sending You a Little Christmas" by pianist Jim Brickman with vocals by Kristy Starling, which moved into the top spot that week.  It spent a single week at number one before being displaced by "Drift Away" by Uncle Kracker featuring Dobie Gray.  Having already spent a lengthy run at number one in 2003, the song ultimately achieved a total of 28 weeks in the top spot, a new record for the AC chart.  The longest run at number one in 2004 was achieved by "Heaven" by Chicano rock group Los Lonely Boys,  which spent ten consecutive weeks atop the chart.  The song with the highest total number of weeks at number one, however, was "100 Years" by John Ondrasik, known under the stage name Five for Fighting, which spent twelve non-consecutive weeks in the top spot.

The only act to have more than one number one in 2004 was singer Josh Groban.  He first topped the chart for four weeks in March and April with his version of the Secret Garden song "You Raise Me Up", which he had performed at Super Bowl XXXVIII in February, in a special NASA commemoration for the previous year's Space Shuttle Columbia disaster, as well as on a special edition of Oprah Winfrey's TV show.  He returned to number one in December with "Believe", taken from the soundtrack of the animated film The Polar Express, which was the final chart-topper of the year.  Although "Believe" received a Grammy Award for Best Song Written for a Motion Picture, Television or Other Visual Media, was nominated for an Academy Award for Best Original Song, and topped the Adult Contemporary chart, it did not enter Billboards all-genre chart, the Hot 100, at all.  None of 2004's AC number ones topped the Hot 100; the top of the all-genre chart was dominated during the year by R&B and hip hop acts such as Usher and Outkast.

Chart history

See also
2004 in music
List of artists who reached number one on the U.S. Adult Contemporary chart

References

2004
United States Adult Contemporary
2004 in American music